is a Japanese professional golfer.

Aoki played on the Japan Golf Tour, winning twice.

Professional wins (3)

Japan Golf Tour wins (2)

*Note: The 1985 Pocari Sweat Open was shortened to 54 holes due to weather.

Japan Challenge Tour wins (1)
1988 Mito Green Open

External links

Japanese male golfers
Japan Golf Tour golfers
Sportspeople from Miyagi Prefecture
1950 births
Living people